Vitus "Veit" Bach (around 1550 – 8 March 1619, Wechmar) was a German baker and miller who, according to Johann Sebastian Bach, founded the Bach family, which became one of the most important families in musical history.

Life and family 
Veit's son, Johannes Bach I (ca. 1580–1626), was the grandfather of Johann Ambrosius Bach, J.S. Bach's father, Veit therefore being Johann Sebastian's great-great-grandfather. There are other theories which hold that a different Veit Bach who died before 1578 in Erfurt was the father of Johann(es)/Hans, and was thus Johann Sebastian's great-great-grandfather.

Evading religious persecution in the Kingdom of Hungary, then under the control of the staunchly Roman Catholic Habsburgs, Bach, being a Protestant, settled in Wechmar, a village in the German state of Thuringia. His descendants continued to live there until Christoph Bach, grandfather of J. S. Bach, moved to Erfurt to take up a position as municipal musician or Stadtpfeifer (town piper). Bach's son Johannes Bach studied music with the town's head piper.

See also
Bach's Nekrolog

References

External links
History of the Bachs

Veit
Businesspeople from Thuringia
German Protestants
Date of birth unknown
Place of birth unknown
1550s births
1619 deaths
16th-century German businesspeople